"I'll See You in My Dreams" is a popular song, composed by Isham Jones, with lyrics by Gus Kahn, and published in 1924. It was recorded on December 4 that year, by Isham Jones conducting Ray Miller's Orchestra. Released on Brunswick Records, it charted for 16 weeks during 1925, spending seven weeks at number 1 in the United States. Other popular versions in 1925 were by Marion Harris; Paul Whiteman; Ford & Glenn; and Lewis James; with three of these four reaching the Top 10.

The song was sung by Jeanne Crain in Margie (1946) and was chosen as the title song of the 1951 film, I'll See You in My Dreams, a musical biography of Kahn.

Popular recordings of it were made by many leading artists, including Cliff Edwards, Louis Armstrong, Bing Crosby (recorded November 27, 1947),  Doris Day, Ella Fitzgerald, Mario Lanza, Tony Martin, Anita O'Day, The Platters, Ezio Pinza, Sue Raney, Jerry Lee Lewis (1958, instrumental), Andy Williams, and Linda Scott.  A "Texas Swing" version of the song was recorded by Bob Wills and his Texas Playboys.

The song was also recorded by Django Reinhardt and the Quintet of the Hot Club of France, and inspired Merle Travis to record it as a guitar instrumental. Many other guitarists, including Chet Atkins and Thom Bresh, followed in Travis's footsteps. Michel Lelong, a French guitarist, published the first tablature of Travis's arrangement for the American publisher/guitarist Stefan Grossman's Guitar Workshop during the 1980s, following by Thom Bresh (Merle Travis's son) for Homespun Tapes, and Marcel Dadi for Stefan Grossman's Guitar Workshop.

It was recorded by Mario Lanza on his Coca-Cola Show of 1951-2 and is available on a compilation album mastered from those same shows, and featuring the same title, I'll See You in My Dreams, released by BMG in 1998.

Pat Boone version
The most recent version of "I'll See You in My Dreams" to become a chart hit is by Pat Boone. It is the title track of his 1962 LP.  The song peaked at number 32 on the Billboard Hot 100 and number nine on the Adult Contemporary chart. It also became a hit in the United Kingdom, where it reached number 27 on the UK Singles Chart.

The record's B-side, "Pictures in the Fire," charted concurrently with "I'll See You in My Dreams," reaching number 77 on the U.S. Billboard Hot 100, number 63 on Cash Box, and number 15 on the Adult Contemporary chart.

Chart history

Other cover versions
 An early version was recorded by Hawaiian steel guitar originator Joseph Kekuku in 1925.
 A 1953/54 version by Eddie Cochran was released in 1997 on the album Rockin' It Country Style.
 In 1963, The Bachelors recorded their version of the song and this appeared on their first EP, The Bachelors.
 In 1976, Ron Goodwin and His Orchestra recorded the song on their album Rhythm and Romance.
 In 1976, British female vocal duo The Pearls released a disco version of the song, which was pressed in the US on a 10" promo disc as well as the regular 7" single. 
 In the late 1980s to the end of the 1990s, Mark Knopfler and Chet Atkins performed it live as a medley with John Lennon's "Imagine".
 In 1999, guitarist Howard Alden recorded an instrumental version of this song for the soundtrack of the movie Sweet and Lowdown.
 In 2002, Joe Brown performed a version of the song on the ukulele as the finale of the George Harrison tribute concert Concert for George.
 In 2003, the Portuguese metal band Moonspell recorded a version that would serve as soundtrack for the short horror movie I'll See You in My Dreams, of which was also recorded a music video.
 In 2004, Dan Hicks & The Hot Licks recorded a version on the album Selected Shorts.
 In 2005, American singer-songwriter Ingrid Michaelson recorded a cover of the song for her debut album Slow the Rain.
 In 2010, Australian singer Melinda Schneider recorded the song for her Doris Day tribute album Melinda Does Doris.
 In 2013, The National front man Matt Berninger recorded the song with Vince Giordano and the Nighthawks Orchestra for the third volume of the Boardwalk Empire soundtrack.
 Canadian jazz pianist and singer Diana Krall included the song in her 2017 studio album Turn Up the Quiet.
 In 2021 country/novelty singer Ray Stevens recorded the song on his studio album Slow Dance.

Film appearances
1939 – Alice Faye sang it in Rose of Washington Square.
1940 – The song was on the soundtrack for the film Kitty Foyle, which won Ginger Rogers her only Academy Award for Best Actress in a Leading Role. Played on the radio at the speakeasy and reprised by the band at the nightclub. It is also danced to by Ginger Rogers and Dennis Morgan. 
1944 – Follow the Boys – performed by Jeanette MacDonald.
1946 – Margie – sung by Jeanne Crain (dubbed by Louanne Hogan) 
1946 – Instrumental versions of the song were featured prominently in The Razor's Edge (arranged by Herbert Spencer); as well as in the opening of the 1946 Tom and Jerry cartoon episode The Milky Waif.
1951 – I'll See You in My Dreams – sung by a chorus during the opening and closing credits, also by Doris Day, and it is played at the surprise party 
1975 – Hearts of the West

References

External links
 Lyrics of this song
 

1924 songs
1925 singles
1962 singles
1976 singles
Songs with lyrics by Gus Kahn
Songs with music by Isham Jones
Linda Scott songs
Pat Boone songs
Eddie Cochran songs
Doris Day songs
The Pearls songs
Private Stock Records singles
Songs about dreams